Blagden may refer to:

Charles Blagden (1748–1820), British physician and scientist
Charles Otto Blagden (1864–1949), English linguist
Claude Martin Blagden (1874–1952), Anglican bishop of Peterborough
George Blagden Westcott (1753–1798), Royal Navy officer
Isa Blagden (1816 or 1817 – 1873), novelist and poet
Joanna Noëlle Blagden Levesque or JoJo (singer) (born 1990), American singer-songwriter and actress
Matthew Blagden Hale (1811–1895), first bishop of Perth, later bishop of Brisbane
Paddy Blagden (born 1935), British Army officer and UN expert on mine clearance

See also
Blagdon (disambiguation)
Bolagen